Methylobrevis pamukkalensis is a species of bacteria.

References

Hyphomicrobiales